VH1 Divas Live 2: An Honors Concert for VH1's Save the Music, aired live from New York's Beacon Theatre on April 13, 1999. It was the second installment in VH1's successful VH1 Divas concert series.

Performers
(in order of appearance)
Tina Turner 
Elton John
Cher
LeAnn Rimes 
Brandy
Faith Hill 
Whitney Houston 
Mary J. Blige
Treach
Chaka Khan

Presenters
Sarah Michelle Gellar
Gloria Reuben
Elizabeth Hurley
Ashley Judd
Cheri Oteri (as Mariah Carey)
Ana Gasteyer (as Celine Dion)
Molly Shannon (as Shania Twain)
Claudia Schiffer. 
Celebrities shown in the audience included Donald Trump, Hugh Grant, Susan Lucci, Star Jones, Martha Stewart, Paul Shaffer, and others.

Set list
 Tina Turner - "The Best"
 Tina Turner - "Let's Stay Together" – Not released on CD or DVD
 Tina Turner & Elton John - "The Bitch Is Back"
 Tina Turner, Elton John, & Cher - "Proud Mary"
 Elton John - "I'm Still Standing"
 Elton John & LeAnn Rimes - "Written in the Stars" – Not released on CD or DVD
 LeAnn Rimes - "How Do I Live"
 Elton John - "Like Father Like Son" – Not released on CD or DVD
 Cher - "If I Could Turn Back Time"
 Cher - "Believe" – Not released on CD or DVD
 Brandy - "Have You Ever?"/"Almost Doesn't Count"
 Brandy & Faith Hill - "(Everything I Do) I Do It for You"
 Faith Hill - "This Kiss"
 Whitney Houston - "It's Not Right, But It's Okay" – Not released on CD or DVD; However, audio version now available for download on US iTunes Store
 Whitney Houston & Mary J. Blige - "Ain't No Way"
 Whitney Houston & Treach - "My Love Is Your Love" – Not released on CD or DVD; However, audio version now available for download on US iTunes Store
 Whitney Houston - "I Will Always Love You"
 Whitney Houston & Chaka Khan - "I'm Every Woman"
 Whitney Houston, Chaka Khan, Faith Hill, Brandy, LeAnn Rimes & Mary J. Blige - "I'm Every Woman (reprise)"

CD track listing

Charts and certifications

Charts

Certifications

References

Whitney Houston albums
1999 live albums
Tina Turner live albums
Various artists albums